Alpette C. Richardson (born September 23, 1957) is a former American football linebacker in the National Football League (NFL) who spent six seasons with the Atlanta Falcons.  He played college football for the Georgia Tech Yellow Jackets.  In his rookie season of 1980, Richardson set the record for most interceptions recorded by a linebacker (7), which he returned for 139 yards, while also recovering three fumbles. He won the AP Defensive Rookie of the Year in 1980 along with Buddy Curry, and made the NFL's All-Pro 2nd team.  He finished his career with 9 interceptions, six fumble recoveries, and 9 sacks.

References

1957 births
Living people
People from Abbeville, Alabama
American football linebackers
Georgia Tech Yellow Jackets football players
Atlanta Falcons players
National Football League Defensive Rookie of the Year Award winners